Ted Skjellum (born 4 March 1972), also known by the stage name Nocturno Culto, is a Norwegian musician best known as the vocalist, lead guitarist, and partial bassist (shared with Fenriz) of the influential black metal band Darkthrone. He has been with the band since 1988. He is also the vocalist of the band Sarke, and has a solo project called Gift of Gods. He currently works in Norway as a school teacher, and has a son and a daughter. He has also released a documentary film called The Misanthrope in which he deals with black metal music and life in Norway.

Discography
Note: All releases are with Darkthrone, unless noted otherwise. This does not include minor guest appearances.

1988 – A New Dimension
1989 – Thulcandra
1989 – Cromlech
1991 – Soulside Journey
1992 – A Blaze in the Northern Sky
1993 – Under a Funeral Moon
1994 – Transilvanian Hunger
1995 – Panzerfaust
1996 – Nemesis Divina (with Satyricon – rhythm guitar)
1997 – Goatlord
1996 – Total Death
1999 – Ravishing Grimness
2001 – Plaguewielder
2003 – Hate Them
2004 – Sardonic Wrath
2006 – The Cult Is Alive
2007 – F.O.A.D.
2008 – Dark Thrones and Black Flags
2009 – Vorunah (with Sarke – vocals)
2010 – Circle the Wagons
2011 – Oldarhian (with Sarke – vocals)
2013 – The Underground Resistance
2013 – Aruagint (with Sarke – vocals)
2013 – Receive (Gift of Gods)
2016 – Bogefod (with Sarke – vocals)
2016 – Arctic Thunder
2017 - Viige Urh (with Sarke - vocals)
2019 - Old Star
2019 - Gastwerso (with Sarke - vocals)
2021 - Eternal Hails......
2022 - Astral Fortress

Filmography
2007 – The Misanthrope (documentary)

References

External links
Nocturno Culto on Encyclopaedia Metallum

1972 births
Living people
Black metal singers
Norwegian heavy metal bass guitarists
Norwegian male bass guitarists
Norwegian black metal musicians
Norwegian schoolteachers
Norwegian heavy metal guitarists
Norwegian heavy metal singers
Norwegian male singers
English-language singers from Norway
Norwegian multi-instrumentalists
Norwegian rock guitarists
Norwegian rock singers
Satyricon (band) members

21st-century Norwegian bass guitarists